Kristin Lehman (born May 3, 1972) is a Canadian actress and dancer known for her roles in the television series Poltergeist: The Legacy, Judging Amy, and The Killing. From 2013 to 2016, she starred as Detective Angie Flynn in the CTV series Motive. In 2018, Lehman played Miriam Bancroft, wife of Laurens Bancroft, in Season 1 of Netflix's Altered Carbon.

Life and career
Lehman was born in New Westminster, British Columbia, Canada, grew up in Vancouver, and studied classical ballet at Canada's Royal Academy of Dance for eight years. She has acted professionally since 1995. In the 1990s, she appeared in Canadian programs such as Forever Knight, Due South and Kung Fu: The Legend Continues, before moving to Los Angeles.

Lehman was a regular cast member in the Showtime horror series Poltergeist: The Legacy (1998–99). She later starred in the short-lived ABC medical drama Strange World (1999). She also was a regular cast member in the short-lived dramas Century City, Tilt, Killer Instinct and Drive. Lehman also appeared in recurring roles in Felicity and Judging Amy, and played guest roles on many shows, including The Outer Limits, The Twilight Zone, Andromeda, Kevin Hill, Prison Break, and Castle.

Lehman's film credits include Alaska (1996), Bleeders (1997), Dog Park (1998), The Way of the Gun (2000), Lie with Me (2005), The Sentinel (2006), The Loft (2013), and television movies Playing House, Rapid Fire and The Gathering.

Lehman starred in AMC's drama series The Killing from 2011 to 2012, and she played the lead role in the Canadian series Motive for four seasons.

Personal life
Lehman is married to actor Adam Reid, and they have a son.

Filmography

Film

Television

References

External links
 
 

1972 births
Living people
20th-century Canadian actresses
21st-century Canadian actresses
Actresses from British Columbia
Actresses from Toronto
Actresses from Vancouver
Canadian female dancers
Canadian film actresses
Canadian people of German descent
Canadian stage actresses
Canadian television actresses
Canadian voice actresses
People from New Westminster